Disjunctive can refer to:

 Disjunctive population, in population ecology, a group of plants or animals disconnected from the rest of its range
 Disjunctive pronoun
 Disjunctive set
 Disjunctive sequence
 Logical disjunction

See also
 Disjoint (disambiguation)
 Disjunct (disambiguation)